Sean Curran is an American gerontologist who is Professor of Gerontology and Vice Dean at the USC Davis School of Gerontology with joint appointments in Molecular and Computational Biology (USC Dana and David Dornsife College of Letters, Arts and Sciences). He also serves as the Dean of Faculty and Research. His expertise is the molecular genetics of healthspan and longevity with an emphasis on biology, genetics, nutrition, and diets.

Education 
Curran earned his B.S. from UCLA in 1999, his Ph.D. from UCLA in 2004 and completed postdoctoral training at Harvard Medical School and Massachusetts General Hospital from 2004-2010.

Research 
Curran and his co-author Gary Ruvkun discovered approximately 60 highly conserved genes that are essential for development but can significantly increase lifespan when inactivated in adulthood.

Curran’s research group has established the existence of gene-diet pairs that predict survival and aging success.  The function of these genes is essential on some diets but dispensable on others [1-2].  There are potentially hundreds, if not thousands of these gene-diet pairs, which when combined, may explain the variance in aging rates across individuals.

Awards 
2014 Nathan Shock Award – Gerontological Society of America 
2015 Ewald Busse Award – Duke Center for the Study of Aging and Human Development 
2020 Vincent Cristofalo Rising Star Award in Aging Research, American Federation for Aging Research (AFAR)

Selected publications

References 

Pang, S., et al., SKN-1 and Nrf2 couples proline catabolism with lipid metabolism during nutrient deprivation. Nat Commun, 2014. 5: p. 5048.
https://www.geron.org/press-room/press-releases/2014-press-releases/371-curran-to-receive-gsa-s-2014-nathan-shock-new-investigator-award
https://www.geron.org/membership/awards/awardees?showall=1

Living people
American gerontologists
University of Southern California faculty
University of California, Los Angeles alumni
Year of birth missing (living people)